Dana Stabenow (born March 27, 1952 in Anchorage, Alaska) is an American author of  science fiction, mystery/crime fiction, suspense/thriller, and historical adventure novels.

Biography
Many of Stabenow's books are set in her home state of Alaska, where she was raised by her single mother who lived and worked on a fish tender in the Gulf of Alaska, and feature numerous descriptions of Alaska's geography, geology, weather, and wildlife.

Stabenow received a BA in journalism from the University of Alaska in 1973 and, after deciding to try her hand as an author, later enrolled in UAA's MFA program.

Her first novel, Second Star, was bought by Ace Science Fiction in 1990. It was followed by two other science fiction books.  Her first Kate Shugak mystery, A Cold Day for Murder, won the Edgar Award for Best Paperback Original in 1993. Her 2011 Kate Shugak mystery, Though Not Dead, received the 2012 Nero Award.

In 2007 Stabenow was named Alaska Artist of the Year in the Governor's Awards for the Arts and Humanities.

In 2011, Stabenow wrote on her blog an informative article about her childhood reading experiences and how these influenced her to write detective novels.

Note: The plots of the Kate Shugak and Liam Campbell Mystery series are interconnected.

Books

Single titles
 Blindfold Game (2006)
 Prepared for Rage (2008)

Silk and Song trilogy 
A historical adventure in which protagonist Wu Johanna, the granddaughter of Marco Polo, travels from her home in 14th-century Cambaluc (Beijing) to Europe. 
 Everything Under the Heavens (2014)
 By the Shores of the Middle Sea (2014)
 The Land Beyond (2015)

Star Svensdotter series 
Stabenow had three books published in the "Star Svensdotter"  science fiction series: 
 Second Star (1991)
 A Handful of Stars (1991)
 Red Planet Run (1995)

Kate Shugak series 
The first book in the mystery series, A Cold Day for Murder, won the Edgar Award for Best Paperback Original in 1993. Characters of the series include Kate Shugak, Mutt (her half-wolf dog), Ekaterina, Jack, Jane, and Johnny Morgan, "Chopper" Jim Chopin, and Samuel Dementieff. 

 A Cold Day for Murder (1992)
 A Fatal Thaw (1992)
 Dead in the Water (1993)
 A Cold Blooded Business (1994)
 Play with Fire (1995)
 Blood Will Tell (1996)
 Breakup (1997)
 Killing Grounds (1998)
 Hunter's Moon (1999)
 Midnight Come Again (2000)
 The Singing of the Dead (2001)
 A Fine and Bitter Snow (2002)
 A Grave Denied (2003)
 A Taint in the Blood (2004)
 A Deeper Sleep (2007)
 Whisper to the Blood (2009)
 A Night Too Dark (2010)
 Though Not Dead (2011)
 Restless in the Grave (2012)
 Bad Blood (2013)
 Less Than a Treason (2017)
  No Fixed Line (2020)

Liam Campbell series 
In 1998, she began a new mystery series featuring Alaska State Trooper Liam Campbell. In addition to Liam Campbell, the books also feature bush pilot Wyanet Chouinard, Moses Alakuyak, and Bar & Grill owner Bill Billington.

 Fire and Ice (1998)
 So Sure of Death (1999)
 Nothing Gold Can Stay (2000)
 Better to Rest (2002)
 Spoils of the Dead (2021)

Eye of Isis series 
Mysteries set in Egypt during the reign of Cleopatra VII.
 Death of an Eye (2018)
 Disappearance of a Scribe (2022)
 Theft of an Idol (2022)

Anthologies 
 The Mysterious North (2002)
 Powers of Detection (2004)
 Unusual Suspects (2008)
 At the Scene of the Crime (2008)

References

External links

 Official Dana Stabenow web site

1952 births
20th-century American novelists
21st-century American novelists
American science fiction writers
American mystery novelists
American thriller writers
American women novelists
Edgar Award winners
Living people
Writers from Anchorage, Alaska
Writers from Alaska
People from Kenai Peninsula Borough, Alaska
University of Alabama alumni
20th-century American women writers
21st-century American women writers
Women mystery writers
Women thriller writers
Women science fiction and fantasy writers